The 1989 OTB Open was a tennis tournament played on outdoor hard courts in Schenectady, New York, in the United States that was part of the 1989 Nabisco Grand Prix and of Tier V of the 1989 WTA Tour. The men's tournament was held from July 17 through July 23, 1989, while the women's tournament was held from July 24 through July 30, 1989. Simon Youl and Laura Gildemeister won the singles titles.

Finals

Men's singles

 Simon Youl defeated  Scott Davis 2–6, 6–4, 6–4
 It was Youl's only title of the year and the 1st of his career.

Women's singles

 Laura Gildemeister defeated  Marianne Werdel 6–4, 6–3
 It was Gildemeister's 1st title of the year and the 4th of her career.

Men's doubles

 Scott Davis /  Broderick Dyke defeated  Brad Pearce /  Byron Talbot 2–6, 6–4, 6–4
 It was Davis' 2nd title of the year and the 9th of his career. It was Dyke's only title of the year and the 7th of his career.

Women's doubles

 Michelle Jaggard /  Hu Na defeated  Sandra Birch /  Debbie Graham 6–3, 6–2
 It was Jaggard's only title of the year and the 2nd of her career. It was Na's only title of the year and the 1st of her career.

References

OTB Open
OTB Open
OTB Open
1989 in American tennis